The 1990 California Secretary of State election was held on November 6, 1990 to elect the Secretary of State of California. Primary elections were held on June 5, 1990. Incumbent Democratic Secretary March Fong Eu was re-elected to her fifth term in office.

Primary election

Democratic

Candidates 

 March Fong Eu, Incumbent
 Mervin L. Evans

Republican

Candidates 

 Joan Milke Flores, Los Angeles Councilwoman
 Gordon P. Levy

Peace and Freedom

Other parties

General election 
Final results from the Secretary of State of California.

References 

Secretary of State
1990
California
California Secretary of State election